The Bedford Y series was a family of single-decker bus and single-decker coach chassis manufactured by Bedford from 1970 to 1986, when Bedford ceased bus and truck production.

History
Announced in September 1970, the Bedford YRQ was a 10-metre (33 ft) coach chassis intended to replace the Bedford VAM. The engine was mounted centrally under the floor.

In 1972 an 11-metre (36 ft) version, the YRT, entered production as a replacement for the twin-steer Bedford VAL.

New more powerful engines were introduced in 1975 with the YLQ (10m) and YMT (11m).

The 1980 YNT was a development of the YMT with a turbocharged engine, while the YLQ became the YMQ and then the YMP.

The 12-metre YNV Venturer with air suspension was the final development of the Y series, announced in 1984.

Bus and truck production by Bedford ceased in 1986.

Chassis summary

The Y series was produced in four different lengths; 8m, 10m, 11m and 12m.  The majority were bodied as coaches, though the 8m, 10m and 11m versions were also built as single-decker buses and midibuses.  Seating capacities varied, but were typically 45 for a 10m bus or coach and 53 for an 11m.  The 12m version was built almost exclusively as a coach, with one exception where a Plaxton Paramount coach body shell was fitted out with bus seats in a high-capacity layout.
Bedford Y series
Eight metres
YMP/S
Ten metres
YRQ
YLQ
YMQ
YMP
Eleven metres
YRT
YMT
YNT
Twelve metres
YNV Venturer

The Bedford Y series was sold extensively in the United Kingdom, mainly to independent operators, as well as in export markets. It was fitted with a wide variety of bodies by different manufacturers, chiefly Duple and Plaxton.

References

Y series
Vehicles introduced in 1970
Buses of the United Kingdom
Coaches (bus)
Midibuses
Bus chassis